Shepherd's Bush is a London Underground station in the district of Shepherd's Bush in the London Borough of Hammersmith and Fulham.

The station originally opened in 1900, but was closed for eight months in 2008 while the surface station building was replaced with a completely new structure and the underground station refurbished.

A number of stations in the area both past and present have borne the name Shepherd's Bush; today the Central line station shares its name with the adjacent London Overground  station, with which it shares a surface-level interchange.

Until 2008, it too was called Shepherd's Bush until it was renamed to avoid confusion.

History

The station opened on 30 July 1900 and was the original western terminus of the Central London Railway (CLR). The original surface-level station building was a terracotta-clad ticket hall with its entrance on the Uxbridge Road facing Shepherd's Bush Green. Like all CLR stations, the station building was designed by Harry Bell Measures.

To the north of the station was located the CLR's power station and Wood Lane depot which was originally accessed by a single track tunnel. The eastbound tunnel ended to the west of the station in a dead-end reversing siding with a cross-over junction connecting it to the westbound tunnel. When the now disused Wood Lane station was opened on 14 May 1908 to the north, a loop tunnel was created connecting to the eastbound tunnel.

An extension to Richmond planned in 1920 would have started here with the next stop at the closed London and South Western Railway station at Hammersmith (Grove Road); the work was never carried out. As part of London Transport's New Works Programme, 1935 - 1940, escalators were installed to replace the original lifts and in 1938, the platforms were lengthened along with those of the other existing Central line stations to accommodate eight cars instead of the previous seven.

Some of the original 1900 features of the station were preserved in areas that are not open to the public. Since 2022, London Transport Museum has been running guided historical tours of the station through its "Hidden London" programme, which take visitors to the disused original station corridors and lift shafts to look at the history of the site.

Westfield redevelopment

A large-scale redevelopment began in 2005 to redevelop the White City area to the north of Shepherd's Bush Green and to construct the Westfield Shopping Centre. As part of this project, Shepherd's Bush Central line station was reconstructed in 2008 by Westfield as part of a Section 106 contribution. The Westfield redevelopment also included the construction of an integrated bus interchange and the new London Overground  station on the West London line. The new Overground station opened on 28 September that year and is close to the site of the former  station which closed in 1940.

During the reconstruction of the Central line station, Transport for London closed the station completely for eight months from 4 February 2008; TfL based their decision on the need to replace the escalators at the same time as rebuilding work. This decision caused local controversy, and critics claimed that the works had been timed to benefit incoming businesses involved in the planned redevelopment of the area, at the cost of local residents and small business holders. The local MP for the Shepherd's Bush constituency, Andy Slaughter, investigated the project and obtained documents under the Freedom of Information Act which showed that the contractor, Metronet, had advised that the work could be completed without closing the station. Shepherd's Bush station re-opened to passengers on 5 October that year.

During the refurbishment, Transport for London did not add lifts to the station as originally planned, citing installation costs of £100 million due to the various underground utilities nearby which would have to be diverted. The London Borough of Hammersmith and Fulham and disability pressure groups have been critical of the fact that the station remains inaccessible for those unable to use stairs.

Connections
Shepherd's Bush station is an OSI for London Overground and National Rail
London Buses routes 31, 49, 72, 94, 95, 148, 207, 220, 228, 237, 260, 272, 283, 295, 316, 607, C1 and night routes N72 and N207 serve the station.

See also
Shepherd's Bush stations

Gallery

References

External links

 London Transport Museum Photographic Archive
 
 
 
 Details of infrastructure improvements
 The front of the station building from a different angle

Central line (London Underground) stations
London Underground Night Tube stations
Tube stations in the London Borough of Hammersmith and Fulham
Former Central London Railway stations
Railway stations in Great Britain opened in 1900
Tube station